Marie Guévenoux (born 2 November 1976) is a French politician of La République En Marche! (LREM) who was elected to the French National Assembly on 18 June 2017, representing the department of Essonne.

Political career
In the Republicans' primaries ahead of the 2017 presidential election, Guévenoux was part of candidate Alain Juppé's campaign staff. When François Fillon was chosen as the party's candidate, she became his campaign team's administrative and financial director. Amid the Fillon affair, however, she resigned from that position and left the Republicans' campaign. 

in the 2017 French legislative election, Guévenoux joined the LREM campaign and became a member of the National Assembly. In parliament, she has since been serving on the Committee on Legal Affairs. She is also a secretary of the Bureau of the National Assembly of the 15th legislature of the French Fifth Republic. In early 2018, she was one of several LREM members who joined an informal parliamentary working group on Islam set up by Florent Boudié in order to contribute to the government's bill aimed at better organising and supervising the financing of the Muslim faith in France. Later that year, she co-chaired (with Éric Bothorel) a group of some twenty parliamentarians involved in organizing a nation-wide consultation process in response to the Yellow vests movement.

In addition to her parliamentary work, Guévenoux is a member of the Commission consultative du secret de la défense nationale (CCSDN), an independent authority in charge of declassification of documents. 

From November 2017 on, Guévenoux was part of LREM's 20-member executive board under the leadership of the party's chairman Christophe Castaner.

Political positions
In July 2019, Guévenoux voted in favor of the French ratification of the European Union’s Comprehensive Economic and Trade Agreement (CETA) with Canada.

See also
 2017 French legislative election

References

1976 births
Living people
Deputies of the 15th National Assembly of the French Fifth Republic
La République En Marche! politicians
21st-century French women politicians
People from Amiens
Women members of the National Assembly (France)
Liberal Democracy (France) politicians
The Republicans (France) politicians
Members of Parliament for Essonne
Deputies of the 16th National Assembly of the French Fifth Republic